Jayathri Ranjani Samarakone (born 18 September 1953) (known as Jayathri Samarakone) is a former Sri Lankan High Commissioner to Singapore. She is a Sri Lankan lawyer, accountant and former diplomat.

Early life
She is the third daughter of Donald Samarakone (formerly of Ceylon Civil Service)
and Srima (née Rathnayake). Samarakone has three sisters Kusum, Sucharitha and Deepthi.

Education
She was educated at Visakha Vidyalaya, Colombo and attended Sri Lanka Law College where she graduated as a lawyer with Honours in 1979. She became an associate member of Sri Lanka Chartered Institute of Management Accountants in 1982.

Diplomatic role
In 2008 she was appointed as a Sri Lankan High Commissioner  to Singapore, where she served as the Head of the Sri Lanka Diplomatic Mission for a period of 3 years. During that time, she played an important role in promoting Ceylon tea, investment, trade, tourism and strengthening the diplomatic relations of Sri Lanka with Singapore.

See also
List of Sri Lankan non-career diplomats

References

Living people
1953 births
Sri Lankan Buddhists
Alumni of Visakha Vidyalaya
Sinhalese lawyers
High Commissioners of Sri Lanka to Singapore
Sri Lankan women ambassadors